DNA (cytosine-5)-methyltransferase 3-like is an enzyme that in humans is encoded by the DNMT3L gene.

Function 

CpG methylation is an epigenetic modification that is important for embryonic development, imprinting, and X-chromosome inactivation. Studies in mice have demonstrated that DNA methylation is required for mammalian development. This gene encodes a nuclear protein with similarity to DNA methyltransferases. This protein is not thought to function as a DNA methyltransferase as it does not contain the amino acid residues necessary for methyltransferase activity. However, this protein does stimulate de novo methylation by DNA cytosine methyltransferase 3 alpha and it is thought to be required for the establishment of maternal genomic imprints. This protein also mediates transcriptional repression through interaction with histone deacetylase 1. Alternative splicing results in two transcript variants. An additional splice variant has been described but its biological validity has not been determined.

Interactions 

DNMT3L has been shown to interact with HDAC1.

References

Further reading